The lead cycle is the biogeochemical cycle of lead through the atmosphere, lithosphere, biosphere, and hydrosphere, which has been influenced by anthropogenic activities.

Natural lead sources

Lead (Pb) is a heavy trace element and is formed by the radioactive decay of uranium and thorium. In crustal rocks, it is present as the lead sulfide mineral galena. Natural sources of lead in the lead cycle include wind borne dust, volcanic outgassing, and forest fires. Natural weathering of rocks by physical and chemical agents can mobilize lead in soils. Mobilized lead can react to form oxides or carbonates. It can co-precipitate with other minerals by being occluded through surface adsorption and complexation

Anthropogenic lead cycle

Anthropogenic activities have accelerated lead mobilization to the environment. The majority of anthropogenic lead comes from non-ferrous metal manufacturing plants, mining and smelting of ores, stationary and mobile fossil fuel combustion platforms, and lead batteries. These activities produce very fine micron-sized Pb particles that can be transported as aerosols. Anthropogenic lead fluxes decreased from the 1980s to the 2000s as a result of global regulation and outlawing of leaded gasoline. However, the global production in lead has seen a steady rise in the 21st century.

Lead accumulation in the ocean

Wet deposition removes lead from the atmosphere to the surface ocean. Precipitation leads to solubilization of aerosols and washout of particulates. Pb concentrations in the oceans is dependent on wet deposition and the concentration of Pb present in atmosphere. The main sink for lead is burial in marine sediments

Lead in drinking water

Lead is highly regulated in drinking water because it affects the developing brain and the nervous system. Children are more prone to lead exposure because they absorb more of ingested Pb from gastrointestinal tracts. Environmental Protection Agency established the Lead and Copper rule (LCR) in 1991 which states that lead and copper concentrations should not exceed 15 ppb and 1.3 ppm in more than 10% of customer taps sampled. In spite of such regulations, lead was found to be in high concentration exceeding the LCR threshold in Flint, Michigan drinking water. The problem was exacerbated when the drinking water supply was switched to Flint river rather than the treated water from Lake Huron and Detroit river. The water was corrosive which caused the dissolution of lead from water pipes. The preventive measure in such cases is to add phosphate to control the mobilization of lead by formation of protective scales.

References 

Biogeochemical cycle
Lead